The V CELAC summit or 2017 CELAC summit was the fifth ordinary heads of state summit of the Community of Latin American and Caribbean States. It was held on 24 and 25 January 2017 in Punta Cana, Dominican Republic.

References

External links 
 Official declaration  (Spanish)

2017 conferences
2017 in international relations
2017 in the Caribbean
Conferences in the Dominican Republic
Summit,2017